Harpulina arausiaca, common name the gold-banded volute, is a species of sea snail, a marine gastropod mollusk in the family Volutidae, the volutes.

References

External links

Volutidae
Gastropods described in 1786